Svein Finnerud (2 September 1945, Oslo – 22 June 2000) was a Norwegian jazz pianist, painter and graphic artist.

Career 
Finnerud was educated at Statens håndverks- og kunstindustriskole (1967–72), under guidance of Chrix Dahl and had several exhibitions and has been purchased by Nasjonalgalleriet. He was known in Norwegian jazz circles in the 1960s, as part of the Knut Audum's Orchestra, where he played with guitarist and bassist Bjørnar Andresen. He established the free jazz band Finnerud Trio (1967–74), with Bjørnar Andresen and drummer Espen Rud. With their Paul Bley inspired musical expression, they played at a number of international jazz festivals, including Warszawa (1970). They released Svein Finnerud Trio (1969), Plastic sun (1970, Odin Records 1993) and Thoughts (1974/1984), and became known for his multi-media art forms of jazz and the visual arts, including working with Peter Opsvik and Carl Magnus Neumann, as well as Henie-Onstad Art Centre.
The trio recorded the album Multimal (1971), a musical setting of poems by poet Trond Botnen. They also took part in the experimental works of Ketil Bjørnstad.
In the 1990s the trio performed at Moldejazz 1993, and the year after released the album Travel Pillow, with Svein Christiansen as replacement on drums (from 1992), and played the Kongsberg Jazz Festival together with the band Close Erase (1997).

In his own name Finnerud released the album Sounds and sights (2000), with contributions by Jon Eberson (guitar), Terje Gewelt (bass), Svein Christiansen (drums) and Nils Petter Molvær (trumpet), as well as his son Bendik Finnerud (piano). The album Egne hoder by Bjørnar Andresen/Paal Nilssen-Love (BP Records, 2000) has multiple inputs from, and dedications to, Finnerud. Furthermore, you will find the composition Ida Lupino, by the American composer Carla Bley on the Turning pages: Jazz in Norway 1960-70 (Norsk jazzarkiv, 2001).

Works 
Graphic works to «M/S Royal Viking», «MS Kong Olav», «Deichmanske bibliotek» and Oregon State University

Honors 
Rolf Stensersen's Grant 1972
La coppa d'argento fra Ist. di San Paolo, Torino 1972
«Statens arbeidsstipend» 1973–75
Kråkerøy municipal Arisholmenstipend 1979

Discography (in selection)

Solo album 
 2000: Sounds and Sights (Resonant)

As band leader 
Within Svein Finnerud Trio
 1969: Svein Finnerud Trio (Norsk jazzforum)
 1970: Plastic Sun (Odin, 1993)
 1971: Multimal (Polydor)
 1984: Thoughts (Odin)
 2008: The Complete Released Works 1968–1999 (Plastic Strip)

References

External links
Svein Finnerud Trio – Med uforutsigbarheten som rettesnor (in Norwegian)
Svein Finnerud Biography on Store Norske Leksikon

20th-century Norwegian pianists
20th-century Norwegian painters
Norwegian male painters
Norwegian jazz composers
Norwegian jazz pianists
Musicians from Oslo
1945 births
2000 deaths
20th-century jazz composers
20th-century Norwegian male artists